The Machilipatnam Urban Development Authority (MUDA) is a special urban planning authority. It was constituted on 1 February 2016, under Andhra Pradesh Urban Areas (Development) Act 1975. The headquarters are located at Machilipatnam in the Krishna district of the Indian state of Andhra Pradesh.

Jurisdiction

References 

Machilipatnam
Urban development authorities of Andhra Pradesh
State urban development authorities of India